Rockaway Creek may refer to:

Rockaway Creek (California), in the Rockaway Beach neighborhood of Pacifica, California
Rockaway Creek (New Jersey), a tributary of the Lamington River in central New Jersey

See also
Rockaway River, a tributary of the Passaic River, in northern New Jersey